Alexandros Angos (17 August 1933 – 18 December 2007) was a Greek and American chess player, Greek Chess Championship winner (1959).

Biography
From the mid-1950s to the begin of 1960s Alexandros Angos was one of Greek leading chess players. In 1959 he won Greek Chess Championship.

Alexandros Angos played for Greece in the Chess Olympiads:
 In 1956, at second board in the 12th Chess Olympiad in Moscow (+4, =5, -6),
 In 1958, at second board in the 13th Chess Olympiad in Munich (+6, =4, -8),
 In 1960, at second board in the 14th Chess Olympiad in Leipzig (+5, =11, -4).

Later Alexandros Angos emigrated to the USA. He lived in Milwaukee for many years.

In 1982, Thinkers' Press published a his book about heavy-figure chess endings called "Endgame Artillery".

References

External links

1933 births
2007 deaths
American chess players
Greek chess players
Chess Olympiad competitors
20th-century Greek Americans